Ave Maria is a 1953 West German drama film directed by Alfred Braun and starring Zarah Leander, Hans Stüwe and Marianne Hold. It was part of the post-war comeback of the Swedish-born Zeander who had been one of the biggest German stars of the Nazi era.

The film's sets were designed by the art directors Hans Ledersteger and Ernst Richter. It was made at the Bavaria Studios in Munich. Location filming took place in Hamburg, Finland and the Starnberger See.

Cast
 Zarah Leander as Karin Twerdy aka Maria Talland
 Hans Stüwe as Dietrich Gontard
 Marianne Hold as Daniela Twerdy
 Hilde Körber as Schwester Benedikta
 Carl Wery as Dr. Melartin
 Ingrid Pan as Christa Gontard
 Hans Henn as Thomas Gontard
 Hedwig Wangel as Die Oberin
 Charlotte Scheier-Herold as Schwester Luitgard
 Ernst Stahl-Nachbaur as Dr. Rieser
 Josef Sieber as Conny
 Hans Stiebner as Hanke
 Berta Drews as Kerstin Melartin
 Elisabeth Wendt as Lisa Nilsson
 Etta Braun as Selma
 Zita Uhl as Schwester Beata
 Ingeborg von Freyberg as Schwester Gundula
 Alfred Braun
 Nikolaus Ellin
 Maria Offermanns
 Bertha Picard as Schwester Ursula
 Ernst Rotmund
 Elisabeth Wardt

References

Bibliography 
 Bock, Hans-Michael & Bergfelder, Tim. The Concise CineGraph. Encyclopedia of German Cinema. Berghahn Books, 2009.

External links 
 

1953 films
1953 drama films
German drama films
West German films
1950s German-language films
Films directed by Alfred Braun
Gloria Film films
German black-and-white films
Films shot at Bavaria Studios
1950s German films